Néo-trad is a musical style from Quebec that arose around the turn of the 21st century.  It can be considered a subgenre of Québécois Folk music. The term combines the Greek prefix neo, meaning new, and the contraction of the word traditionnelle, as in traditional music.

It basically constitutes modernized Quebec folklore music, usually with  rock and/or electronica. Some notable néo-trad artists are Mes Aïeux, Les Cowboys Fringants and Mara Tremblay. Okoumé can also be considered a néo-trad  precursor.

The expression can also encompass all Trad groups, modern times bands playing Québécois folklore (in a traditional way) like La Bottine Souriante, Les Charbonniers de l'enfer, La Volée d'Castors and Les Batinses. Inversely, the term Trad can encompass néo-trad groups.

See also
List of Quebec musicians
Music of Quebec
Culture of Quebec
List of musical styles
Folklore

References

External links
 .

Quebec music
Canadian styles of music
Folk music genres